Ryan Joseph McGinness (born January 9, 1972) is an American artist, living and working in Manhattan, New York. Known for his original extensive vocabulary of graphic drawings which use the visual language of public signage, corporate logos, and contemporary iconography, McGinness creates paintings, sculptures, and environments. McGinness is interested in assuming the power of this anonymous aesthetic in order to share personal expressions. His work is in the permanent public collections of the Museum of Modern Art, Virginia Museum of Fine Arts, Museum of Contemporary Art San Diego, Cincinnati Art Museum, MUSAC in Spain, and the Misumi Collection in Japan.

Early life and upbringing
McGinness grew up in the surf and skate culture of Virginia Beach, Virginia, an influence that is visible in much of his work. He then studied graphic design and fine art at Carnegie Mellon University in Pittsburgh, Pennsylvania as an Andrew Carnegie Scholar. During college, he interned at the Andy Warhol Museum as a curatorial assistant.

Public Collections
Albright-Knox Art Gallery, Buffalo, N.Y.
 AkzoNobel Art Foundation, Amsterdam
Cincinnati Art Museum, Cincinnati, Ohio
Columbus Museum of Art, Columbus, Ohio
Cranbrook Art Museum, Bloomfield Hills, Mich.
EMMA - Espoo Museum of Modern Art, Espoo, Finland
Metropolitan Museum of Art, New York
Mori Art Museum, Tokyo, Japan
MUSAC, Museo de Arte Contemporáneo de Castilla y León, Leon, Spain
Museum of Contemporary Art, San Diego, Calif.
Museum of Contemporary Art, Tokyo, Japan
Museum of Modern Art, New York
New York Public Library, New York
Saatchi Gallery, London
Virginia Museum of Fine Arts, Richmond, Va.

Books
"Everything Is Everywhere", 2014,   
"Sketchbook Selections", 2000-2012, 2013, 
Women: New (Re)presentations", 2013,  Studio Franchise, 2010, Published by La Casa Encendia,   Studio Manual, 2010, Published by La Casa Encendida,  Ryan McGinness Works., 2009, Published by Rizzoli, No Sin/No Future, 2008, Published by Gingko Press,  Aesthetic Comfort, 2008, Published by Arkitip, Installationview, 2005, Published by Rizzoli,  Multiverse, 2005, Published by Galerie du Jour,  Project Rainbow, 2003, Published by Gingko Press, Sponsorship, 2003, Published by Anthem Press & BLK/MRKT, Second Edition Published by Gingko Press, Gasbook, 2002, Published by Gas Exchange,  Pieceofmind, 2001, Published by Colette,  Vocabularytest, 2001, Published by Joseph Silvestro Gallery,  Luxurygood, 2000, Published by Alife,  Flatnessisgod'', 1999, Published by RSUB,

External links

References

Living people
1972 births
20th-century American painters
American male painters
21st-century American painters
21st-century male artists
People from Virginia Beach, Virginia
Carnegie Mellon University College of Fine Arts alumni
Painters from Virginia